Gordon Wylde (born 12 November 1964), is a Scottish association football player and manager. He played for East Stirlingshire, Kilmarnock, Queen of the South and Clyde, and managed East Stirlingshire from 2006 to 2008.

Playing career
Wylde began his senior career at the Shire, before joining Kilmarnock in 1988. He then had a brief spell at Queen of the South, before joining Clyde.

Managerial career
Wylde was appointed assistant coach to the reserve team during his time at Broadwood Stadium, and was promoted to assistant manager of the first team when Gardner Spiers was appointed manager. He left the club after Spiers was sacked.

He was assistant manager at East Stirlingshire to Dennis Newell from March 2004 to December 2005. When Newall was sacked, Wylde became his replacement in early 2006. The Shire saw considerable improvement under Wylde's tenure, even though he failed to prevent them finishing bottom of the Scottish Third Division. However season 2007–08 saw the club exceed expectations. He won the division's Manager of the Month award in August 2007.

Wylde led the club to the Scottish Cup third round, where they faced Scottish Premier League title challengers Rangers at Ibrox Stadium. The Shire lost 6–0. He resigned from his position at East Stirlingshire after a run of poor results on 28 February 2008. His reason for resigning was health issues due to the stress of attempting to keep the club from finishing bottom of the Third Division for a fifth season in succession. This would have potentially resulted in the club losing their league status, and he cited the unrealistic expectations of the fans having a bearing on his decision.

Wylde returned to Clyde in January 2010, as under-19 coach, and was promoted to assistant head coach in April 2010.

Personal life
Wylde's son, Gregg, played for Rangers.

References

External links 
 

Living people
Scottish footballers
East Stirlingshire F.C. players
Kilmarnock F.C. players
Queen of the South F.C. players
Clyde F.C. players
Clyde F.C. non-playing staff
East Stirlingshire F.C. managers
1964 births
Association football midfielders
Scottish Football League players
Drumchapel Amateur F.C. players
Scottish Football League managers
Scottish football managers